Harmony Row is a 1933 Australian musical comedy directed by F. W. Thring and Raymond Longford and starring popular stage comedian George Wallace. It marked the film debut of Bill Kerr.

Plot
George enlists in the police force and is assigned to Harmony Row, a haunt of criminals such as Slogger Lee. He makes several friends, including the pretty street musician Molly, and boy soprano Leonard. He is persuaded to fight Slogger Lee in a boxing tournament. He manages to defeat Slogger and win, and is united with Molly.

Cast

George Wallace as Contable Dreadnought
Phyllis Baker as Molly
Marshall Crosby as the sergeant
John Dobbie as Slogger Lee
Bill Kerr as Leonard
Bill Innes as Detective Brooks
Edwin Brett as the father
Norman Shepherd as the butler
Norman French as the husband
Bebe Scott as the wife
Gertrude Boswell as the housekeeper
Leonard Stephens as the Ferrett
Dan Thomas
Nell Fleming
Nell Crane
Elza Stenning
Thelma Scott
Dorothy Weeks
Johnny Marks
Campbell Copelin

Original play

The film was based on a revue Wallace had performed in the 1920s. It was one of a series of "revusicals" written by Wallace during this period.

Production
The film marked the feature film debut of Bill Kerr who had been cast by Thring in a proposed movie called Pick and the Duffers. That movie was not made but he was then cast in Harmony Row.

The full version of the film features a haunted house sequence where George unravels a mystery in a mansion. In some versions of the film this sequence was cut and replaced with one where George arrests a high society gentlemen (Campbell Copelin), thinking he's a thief.

Reception
The film was released on a double bill with Diggers in Blighty and was a success at the box office. The two films grossed £8000 in Melbourne and £3070 in two weeks in Sydney.

The critic from The Sydney Morning Herald called it "the first really successful picture that Efftee Films have produced."

The film was released in England.

References

Fitzpatrick, Peter, ''The Two Frank Thrings, Monash University, 2012

External links
Harmony Row in the Internet Movie Database
Harmony Row at Australian Screen Online
Harmony Row at Oz Movies
Harmony Row at Australian Variety Theatre Archive
Copyright information at National Archives of Australia

1933 films
Australian musical comedy films
1933 musical comedy films
Films directed by F. W. Thring
Films directed by Raymond Longford
Australian black-and-white films